The 2007 Tipperary Senior Hurling Championship is an annual competition between the top hurling clubs in Tipperary. The winners of the Tipperary Championship qualify to represent their county in the Munster Club Championship, the winners of which go on to the All-Ireland Senior Club Hurling Championship.

The Tipperary County Champions in 2006 were Toomevara who became champions with a win over Nenagh Éire Óg. The Tipperary senior hurling championship is probably the most complicated system in Ireland as it strives to accommodate 25 teams. A knockout divisional system and group backdoor system has been introduced to accommodate these teams. Before the new system, the county championship was run on a divisional basis with the teams in the divisional finals going into the county quarter-finals and proceeding from there. It may not be long before this system is re-introduced because of the complexity of the current championship.

2007 Divisional Championship

North Tipperary 
The North Tipperary Championship is contested by nine teams: Borris-Ileigh, Burgess, Kildangan, Kilruane McDonaghs, Moneygall, Nenagh Éire Óg, Portroe, Roscrea, Toomevara.
The championship is a knockout competition with the losers apart from the semi final runner-up entering the County Championship. The winners of the North Championship advance to the quarter final of the County Championship.

Mid Tipperary 
The Mid Tipperary Championship is contested by seven teams: Boherlahan-Dualla, Drom-Inch, Holycross-Ballycahill, J.K. Bracken's, Loughmore-Castleiney, Thurles Sarsfields and Upperchurch-Drombane.
The championship is a knockout competition with the losers apart from the one semi final runner-up (Upperchurch-Drombane in 2006) entering the County Championship. The winners of the Mid Championship advance to the county quarter final. Upperchurch-Drombane receive a bye to the semi final.

West Tipperary 
The West Tipperary Championship is contested by five teams: Cappawhite, Cashel King Cormacs, Clonoulty-Rossmore, Éire Óg Annacarty and Knockavilla-Donaskeigh Kickhams. The championship is a knockout competition with the winners advancing to the quarter final of the County Championship. The other four contestants also play in the first phase of the County Championship (group stage).

South Tipperary 
The South Tipperary Championship is contested by four teams: Ballingarry, Carrick Swans, Killenaule and Mullinahone.
The championship is a 'knockout' competition. However, the three semi-finalists losers going into the County Championship. The winners of the South Championship advance directly to the quarter final of the County championship, while the other three divisional semi-finalists also play in the first phase of the County Championship (group stage).

2007 Tipperary County Championship 
The 14 teams defeated in their divisional championship are divided into groups of 4.Top Team in each group go into Round 2. Group 2 winners receive a Bye (Drawn).Other 3 play remaining 3 beaten Semi Finalists in North and Mid.ie. Loughmore-Castleiney v J.K. Bracken's, Nenagh Éire Óg v Kildangan and Toomevara v Borris-Ileigh. Bottom team  in each Group contest Relegation play-off.

Group 1

Group 2

Group 3

Group 4

External links
 Tipperary on Hoganstand
 Tipperary Club GAA
 Premierview

Tipperary Senior Hurling Championship
2007